The Washington D.C. Area Film Critics Association Award for Best Score is one of the annual awards given by the Washington D.C. Area Film Critics Association. The award was first given in 2010.

Winners and nominees

2010
 Hans Zimmer for Inception
 Carter Burwell for True Grit
 Clint Mansell for Black Swan
 A. R. Rahman for 127 Hours
 Trent Reznor and Atticus Ross for The Social Network

2011
 Ludovic Bource for The Artist
 Cliff Martinez for Drive
 Trent Reznor and Atticus Ross for The Girl with the Dragon Tattoo
 Howard Shore Hugo
 John Williams for War Horse

2012
 Jonny Greenwood for The Master
 Alexandre Desplat for Moonrise Kingdom
 Dan Romer and Benh Zeitlin for Beasts of the Southern Wild
 Howard Shore for The Hobbit: An Unexpected Journey
 John Williams for Lincoln

2013
 Hans Zimmer for 12 Years a Slave
 Christophe Beck for Frozen
 Arcade Fire for Her
 Thomas Newman for Saving Mr. Banks
 Steven Price for Gravity

2014
 Mica Levi for Under the Skin
 Jóhann Jóhannsson for The Theory of Everything
 Trent Reznor and Atticus Ross for Gone Girl
 Antonio Sánchez for Birdman or (The Unexpected Virtue of Ignorance)
 Hans Zimmer for Interstellar

2015
 Jóhann Jóhannsson for Sicario
 Michael Brook for Brooklyn
 Carter Burwell for Carol
 Ennio Morricone for The Hateful Eight
 Junkie XL for Mad Max: Fury Road

2016
 Justin Hurwitz for La La Land
 Nicholas Britell for Moonlight
 Jóhann Jóhannsson for Arrival
 Mica Levi for Jackie
 Cliff Martinez for The Neon Demon

2017
 Hans Zimmer and Benjamin Wallfisch for Blade Runner 2049
 Carter Burwell for Three Billboards Outside Ebbing, Missouri
 Alexandre Desplat for The Shape of Water
 Michael Giacchino for Coco
 Hans Zimmer for Dunkirk

2018
 Nicholas Britell for If Beale Street Could Talk
 Ludwig Göransson for Black Panther
 Justin Hurwitz for First Man
 Thom Yorke for Suspiria
 Hans Zimmer for Widows

2019
 Michael Abels for Us
 Thomas Newman for 1917
 Hildur Guðnadóttir for Joker
 Alexandre Desplat for Little Women
 Randy Newman for Marriage Story

2020
 Jon Batiste, Trent Reznor, and Atticus Ross for Soul
 Ludwig Göransson for Tenet
 James Newton Howard for News of the World
 Emile Mosseri – Minari
 Trent Reznor and Atticus Ross – Mank

2021
 Hans Zimmer for Dune' 
 Aaron Dessner and Bryce Dessner for Cyrano 
 Alexandre Desplat for The French Dispatch 
 Jonny Greenwood for The Power of the Dog –
 Jonny Greenwood for Spencer''

See also
 

Score, Best
Film awards for best score